Slobodan Kezunović (Serbo-Croatian Cyrillic: Слободан Кезуновић; 26 March 1920 – 10 March 2006) was a communist revolutionary, Yugoslav Partisan who reached the rank of Major general in the Yugoslav 1st Proletarian Corps, 1st and 4th Armies during the Second World War and was a councillor at the second Anti-Fascist Council for the National Liberation of Yugoslavia. He forged a military career after the war, being named Chief of staff of the Territorial Defense Forces of Bosnia and Herzegovina.  From 1955 to 1956 he was president of the assembly of Yugoslav First League club FK Sarajevo.

References

1920 births
2006 deaths
People from Sokolac
FK Sarajevo presidents of the assembly
Serbs of Bosnia and Herzegovina
Yugoslav Partisans